The Seal of Niue, or the Public Seal of Niue, is the official seal of Niue. It was adopted in September 2021. The first version of the seal was created in 1974 when Niue gained self-governing status and joined into free association with New Zealand.

History
Before 1974 Niue used the Coat of Arms of New Zealand. The Niue Constitution Act, passed in 1974, provided for the first unique seal to be created for Niue. The Seal was to be held by the Speaker of the Niue Assembly and was to be used to authenticate public documents or to affirm the creation of new laws by the Cabinet of Niue. The Speaker is also responsible for ensuring that the Seal is not misused. All judicial notices in Niue are affixed with the Seal. In 1977, after a request from the Niue Assembly, the Parliament of New Zealand passed the Seal of New Zealand Act with an amendment relating to Niue to bring the design of the Public Seal of Niue into line with the other nations in the Realm of New Zealand. Before 2007 the Seal of Niue was used in Tokelau to confirm the passage of legislation. In 2007 the Tokelau Amendment Act 2007 was passed, which replaced the use of the Seal of Niue in Tokelau and substituted it with "under the hand of the Administrator of Tokelau".

The Niuean Cabinet approved a new design for the Seal of Niue as per article 15 of the Niue Constitution, and the Niue Assembly passed an act for its use on 29 September 2021. However, this design had already been used on commemorative coins produced for Niue by the New Zealand Mint at least as early as 2019.

Current design
The 2021 design consists of a crown (representing the sovereign as head of state), mounted on a blue outer circle in the form of a traditional Niuean garland of 14 seashells (representing the 14 villages of Niue). This sits upon a scroll bearing the motto "" (God, Niue Eternally) and two  (cleaving clubs), representing defence and security. Between the outer and inner circles are the words "Public Seal of Niue".

The design of the 1974 seal

The 1974 design of the Seal of Niue had at its centre the coat of arms of New Zealand, which is a shield divided into quarters. In the first quarter is the constellation of the Southern Cross, in the second a golden fleece, a sheaf of wheat in the third, and two crossed hammers in the fourth. Over the four-quarters in the centre appears a white band on which there are three black ships. The shield is supported by a woman dressed in a white robe carrying the flag of New Zealand, representing the population that descended from European immigrants (mainly British), and a Māori warrior armed with a taiaha, representing the indigenous population. At the head of the shield is a crown, and at the foot of the shield is a ribbon with the words "New Zealand". The seal was on a white circle, with "Public Seal of Niue" along the top, and "Niue" at the bottom.

See also
Flag of Niue

References

External links

National seals
National symbols of Niue
Niue
Niue
Niue
Niue
Niue
Niue
Niue
Niue
Niue
Niue
Niue
1974 establishments in Niue